Rocky Walcher (born October 12, 1961) is an American professional golfer.

Walcher was born in Carnegie, Oklahoma. He played college golf at Southwestern Oklahoma State University. He was inducted into the SWOSU Athletic Hall of Fame in 2006.

Walcher played on the Nationwide Tour and the PGA Tour between 1991 and 2003. On the Nationwide Tour (1991–93, 1996-2000, 2002–03), he won once at the 1996 Nike Omaha Classic. On the PGA Tour (1994, 2001) his best finish was T-8 at the 1995 Deposit Guaranty Golf Classic.

Professional wins (3)

Nike Tour wins (1)

Other wins (2)
2004 Oklahoma Open
2007 Oklahoma Open

Results in major championships

CUT = missed the half-way cut
"T" = tied
Note: Walcher only played in the U.S. Open.

See also
1993 PGA Tour Qualifying School graduates
2000 PGA Tour Qualifying School graduates

References

External links

American male golfers
Southwestern Oklahoma State Bulldogs men's golfers
PGA Tour golfers
Golfers from Oklahoma
People from Carnegie, Oklahoma
1961 births
Living people